Locusts are the swarming phase of certain species of short-horned grasshoppers in the family Acridida.

Locust or Locusts may also refer to:

Biology

Insects 
 Cicadas, often called locusts when they swarm
 Magicicada, a genus of cicadas often referred to as "13-year or 17-year locusts"

Plants
 Plants of the genus Robinia:
 The black locust (Robinia pseudoacacia), a leguminous tree with toxic pods
 Plants of the genus Gleditsia
 The honey locust (Gleditsia triacanthos), a leguminous tree with pods having a sweet edible pulp
 Locust bean, fruit of the carob tree (Ceratonia siliqua)
 African locust bean, fruit of the néré tree (Parkia biglobosa)

Arts and entertainment

Films
 Locust (film), a 2015 Russian erotic thriller
 Locusts: The 8th Plague, a 2005 horror movie
 Locusts (2005 film), a 2005 American television film directed by David Jackson and aired on CBS
 Locusts (2019 film), a 2019 Australian independent feature film
 The Locusts (film), a 1997 American film starring Vince Vaughn and Kate Capshaw

Music
 Locust, an alias of electronic artist Mark Van Hoen from Touch Records
 Locust Music, a Chicago-based record label
 The Locust, a US noise-rock band from California
 The Locust (album)
 The Locust (EP)
 Ghosts VI: Locusts, an album from the American industrial rock band Nine Inch Nails
 Locust, a 1997 album from the  Swedish hardcore / thrash metal band Mary Beats Jane
 Locust, an album from the French metal band Lyzanxia
 "Locust", a song by a-ha from their 1993 album Memorial Beach
 "Locust", a song by heavy-metal band Machine Head from their 2011 album Unto the Locust

Other
 Locust (comics), a minor Marvel Comics foe of the X-Men
 Locust Horde, the main enemy force in the third-person shooter video game series Gears of War
 Locust, a light BattleMech in the fictional BattleTech universe
 Locust, a Fairy chess piece which captures by hopping over its victim (as in checkers)
 Locust, a quadruped Covenant anti-building vehicle in the video game Halo Wars 
 Locusts, a mythological hybrid creature appearing in the Book of Revelation

Places
In the United States
 Locust, Kentucky, an unincorporated community
 Locust, Missouri, an unincorporated community
 Locust, New Jersey, an unincorporated community
 Locust, North Carolina, a city
 Locust, Pennsylvania, an unincorporated community
 Locust, West Virginia, an unincorporated community
 Locust Township, Christian County, Illinois
 Locust Township, Columbia County, Pennsylvania
 Locust Lake, Pennsylvania
 Locust Fork of the Black Warrior River, a tributary in Alabama
 Locust Creek (Grand River), a stream in Missouri
 Locust Creek (Gravois Creek), a stream in Missouri
 Locust Creek (Shamokin Creek), Pennsylvania
 Locust Creek (West Virginia) - see Locust Creek Covered Bridge (West Virginia)

In the military
 HMS Locust, three ships of the Royal Navy
 USS Locust, two ships of the US Navy
 M22 Locust, an unsuccessful American World War II light tank
 Operation Locust, an Australian World War II commando raid in New Guinea

People
 Stephen V of Moldavia, Prince of Moldavia from 1538 to 1540
 Rich LeFevre, competitive eater nicknamed "The Locust"

Other uses 
 Locust (car), a kit car inspired by the Lotus 7
 Locust, a GWR Metropolitan Class locomotive
 Locust (finance), a term used in discussions critical of capitalism in Germany
 Locust United Methodist Church, a historic African-American church in Columbia, Maryland

See also
 Les Sauterelles (French for "the Locusts"), a Swiss musical group

Animal common name disambiguation pages